Louise Anne Beris (aka "Beatrice") Fiona Robey  is a Canadian children's book writer and illustrator, singer-songwriter, former model, and actress. During much of her varied career, she used only her last name Robey as a stage name. She is best known for her role as Micki Foster in the television series Friday the 13th: The Series (1987–1990).

Early life and education
Robey was born in Montreal, Quebec, Canada. Her father, Colonel Malcolm Vernon Robey, was a pilot in the Royal Canadian Air Force, and her mother was a former London stage actress.

Robey was raised and educated throughout Europe, France, Italy, Norway, Scotland, Canada and West Germany, learning to speak four languages. She attended St Leonards School in St Andrews, Fife, Scotland. She is a graduate of Elmwood School in Ottawa.

Career

Writing, singing, acting, modelling
After high school, Robey travelled to Aix-en-Provence. French photographer Jacques Henri Lartigue spotted her sunbathing at a hotel pool, took her photograph, and invited her to become a model. Lartigue photographed Robey for Paris Match and Vogue Paris. Robey moved to Paris, where she swiftly attained success as a fashion model. She also began a music career, busking in the streets and fronting the ska-punk band Louise and the Creeps signed to CBS France and UK by president Alain Levy. In the early 1980s, Robey moved to New York City, where she worked as a catwalk model earning $5,000 a day and appeared in advertising campaigns for Maybelline, Jordache, Revlon, L'Oreal and Clairol amongst many others. She has appeared in many magazines from Vogue to Cosmopolitan internationally.

Although Louise and the Creeps were signed to a record deal with CBS France/UK by CBS head Alain Levy, under the wing of Andy Warhol and Michael Butler [producer of the musical Hair] and offered a signing by Chris Blackwell, Island records, they broke up in New York before recording an album. In 1984, Robey landed a solo record deal with CBS/Sony and recorded a self-titled album. Six singles from the album were released. One single, a cover of the song "One Night in Bangkok" from the musical Chess, became an international hit. Robey's version of the song spent three weeks on the Billboard Hot 100 in March 1985, peaking at No. 77. It fared much better on the Billboard Hot Dance Club Play chart, peaking at No.3.She signed to Chrysalis records in 1986 and had a hit dance record I Surrender/Hungry For You Boy.

Acting and current work
While working as a musician, Robey continued to model and also became involved in improvisational comedy, performing with the famed troupe M.I.C.E.[Mike's improv comedy experiment] in theatres and clubs throughout California. She also appeared in stage roles in dinner theater. In 1986, Robey had small roles in the films The Money Pit and Raw Deal. The following year, she beat out 300 plus other actresses for the role of Michelle "Micki" Foster, niece of antiques dealer Lewis Vendredi, on the syndicated science-fi series Friday the 13th: The Series, which Frank Mancuso Jr. produced.  Foster was a young woman who had inherited an antique shop from Lewis Vendredi (R. G. Armstrong), her estranged uncle. When the antiques in the shop proved to have been cursed by the devil, Foster, Ryan Dallion (John D. LeMay), her cousin by marriage, and family friend Jack Marshak (Chris Wiggins) begin to hunt down and recover the antiques before they could kill, or cause the damnations of the souls of, anyone else. The show, which was filmed in Toronto, was a hit with audiences and became one of the top three syndicated dramas airing at the time second only to Star Trek.She was nominated for best actress by the Saturn's. The sophisticated glamour and feisty charm Robey imparted to the character earned the show a cult following. She later recalled convincing the producers to give Foster her fashion-forward and striking look.She quit LA for good to return to Europe after auditioning for and being accepted to Oxford University to study Shakespearean Theatre under Sir Derek Jacobi and graduated with honors. In 1993 she received a Spanish Arts award in Madrid.

In December 2013, Robey released a new single, "Take It to the Top," a collaboration with recording artist Lovari. The single debuted at No. 87 on the iTunes U.S. Dance Chart. In 2010 released Anthology Part One 1979 to 2009 on Amazon, a collection of her songs. A new album is in the works.
She is currently in preproduction as creator/writer/producer of "Satan's Ark" in the UK/France.

Personal life
In 1993, Robey began dating Charles Beauclerk, Earl of Burford, direct descendant of King Charles II and his mistress, actress Nell Gwynn. The two met after Lord Burford gave a lecture about one of his relatives, the 17th Earl of Oxford, who is one of several authors named in the Shakespeare authorship question. The couple married on 29 December 1994 at St. Winifreds Church in Manaton, Dartmoor. At the time of the marriage, Robey was pregnant with the couple's child. Their son James Malcolm Aubrey de Vere Beauclerk, Lord Vere, Baron of Hanworth was born in Boston on 2 August 1995 and next in line as the Earl of Burford. The couple lived in Ipswich and Hadleigh, Suffolk, before divorcing in 2001. She is mother of the future Duke of St. Albans. 

She is acknowledged as the instigator and researcher for Charles Beauclerk's book "Nell Gwynn"[Macmillan] which was the inspiration for the hit West End play Nell Gwynn starring Gemma Atherton [2016].

In 2008 she was engaged secondly Stanley "Stan" Howard Shaffer, a top fashion photographer born in Brooklyn, New York, in 1944, without issue. He died on 1 June 2010.

Filmography

Discography

Albums
 Robey (1985, CBS/Sony)
 Music Anthology... Part 1: 1979-2009 (2011, Amazon/TuneCore Records)

Singles

Soundtracks
 "Web of Desire" (with White Lion) (1986, The Money Pit soundtrack)

References

 "Burke's Peerage and Baronetage"

Further reading

External links
 
 
 

1960 births
Living people
20th-century Canadian actresses
Actresses from Montreal
British courtesy countesses
Canadian dance musicians
Canadian expatriates in France
Canadian expatriates in the United Kingdom
Canadian expatriates in the United States
Canadian film actresses
Canadian people of English descent
Canadian people of Scottish descent
Canadian pop singers
Canadian rock singers
Canadian singer-songwriters
Canadian stage actresses
Canadian television actresses
Canadian women singer-songwriters
Female models from Quebec
People educated at St Leonards School
Singers from Montreal
Women rock singers